Blake High School may refer to:

In the United States:
 Howard W. Blake High School - Tampa, Florida
 James Hubert Blake High School - Silver Spring, Maryland

See also
Blake School (disambiguation)